Coleyville is a rural locality in the Scenic Rim Region, Queensland, Australia.

Geography
In the east of Coleyville elevations rise towards the summit of Mount Walker. Mount Walker Creek, a tributary of Warrill Creek, is the main waterway in the locality. The land, like most parts of the Fassifern Valley, is mainly used for agricultural purposes.

History
The locality is named after settlers Philemon and Sylvia Coley. in 1866 the couple emigrated from Halesowen, Worcestershire, England,  and settled in the area.

Coleyville Provisional opened on 21 July 1890, On 1 January 1909 it became Coleyville State School.  It closed in 1926 due to low attendances, but reopened in 1928. It closed permanently in 1964. It was located at 1080 Coleyville Road.

The locality contains 55 households, in which 50.0% of the population are males and 50.0% of the population are females with a median age of 45, 7 years above the national average. The average weekly household income is $1,812, $374 above the national average. 4.8% of Coleyville's population is either of Aborigional or Torres Strait Islander descent. 65.9% of the population aged 15 or over is either registered or de facto married, while 33.1% of the population is not married. 31.2% of the population is currently attending some form of a compulsory education. The most common nominated ancestries were Australian (31.3%), English (31.3%) and German (13.6%), while the most common country of birth was Australia (85.6%), and the most commonly spoken language at home was English (87.4%). The most common nominated religions were No religion (19.9%), Anglican (18.8%) and the Churches of Christ (16.5%). The most common occupation was a manager (19.2%) and the majority/plurality of residents worked 40 or more hours per week (52.9%).

References

External links

Scenic Rim Region
Localities in Queensland